El Bordo is a town in Cauca Department in Colombia.

It is the administrative centre of Patía municipality.
Another name for el bordo is patia.
At the most recent count it had 11 679 inhabitants.

Populated places in the Cauca Department